The Flying Culinary Circus is a team of four chefs from Norway. They are considered the only constantly travelling chef group in the world.

They have cooked for Royal families (Norway, Denmark, Malaysia, UAE) and celebrities like The Black Eyed Peas, Pharrell Williams, a-ha, Guns N' Roses, Ke$ha and more. The chefs have visited 44 countries, from the US to Malaysia from France to South Africa.

The Flying Culinary Circus cater to all kinds of events, from gala dinners to celebrity parties. They are known for always adding a special performance to an event. They do stunts like flying in on parachutes or on a zip-line and lighting their dishes on fire.

The Members 

Trond Svendgård (Age: 30): Fish and Seafood Expert

Born in the fish paradise of Northern Norway and trained by some of the best chefs in the world at Culinary Institute and Culinary National Team of Norway. In 2003, he won the gold medal at Bocuse D'Or with Charles Tjessem.

Hans Kristian Larsen(Age: 28): Meat Expert

As an educated butcher Hans travelled around the world to learn more in his field. For instance, he has worked at Mel Gibson's "Moonshadowrestaurant in Santa Barbara, CA. Also, he was employed as the 2-star-Michelin restaurant Bagatelle in Oslo, Norway.

Mathias Spieler Bugge (Age: 25): Sauce & Soup Expert

At an early age, Mathias travelled to France to learn about the famous French cuisine. After a few years at exclusive hotels in Singapore and Dubai his talent for sauces was discovered at the 2-star-Michelin restaurant Bagatelle in Oslo, Norway.

Tor Jørgen Kramprud Arnesen (Age: 28): Herbes & Vegetable Expert

Spending his childhood in a green house in the Norwegian wilderness, he developed a very distinct knowledge of herbs and vegetables. He was formally executive chef at the high-end resort "Per Gynt Garden" in Norway that has been voted one of the top 10 "hideaway spots" by Tatler Magazine in 2009.

Background 

The group was founded in 2005 when the chefs did their first event at the Norwegian embassy in Central Park in New York. Before that, the chefs had individually worked at various critically acclaimed and Michaelin-star restaurants both in Norway and abroad.

External links 

Official website: www.fccircus.com

References 
 http://www.norway.org
 Cumi & Ciki, Malaysia, 2009
 Cumi & Ciki, Malaysia, 2011
 Cergy Pontoise Nightclub Blog
 BISS Magazine, Germany
 Press Reel

Norwegian chefs
Quartets